White Gold is a British sitcom featuring a group of UPVC window salesmen in mid-1980s Corringham, Essex. It stars Ed Westwick as Vincent, the head of a double-glazed windows sales team, with former Inbetweeners cast members Joe Thomas and James Buckley. BBC Two announced that series two of the show would air on 6 March 2019. Series 1 was released internationally by Netflix on 11 August 2017.
Series 2 was released internationally by Netflix on 17 May 2019.

Production
The show is produced by BBC Comedy along with Fudge Park Productions, which was established in 2015 by the creators of The Inbetweeners – Damon Beesley and Iain Morris. Beesley created White Gold and acts as show runner and executive producer, in addition to having written eight of the 12 episodes. Joe Thomas and Chris Niel wrote two episodes each.

Production of series 2 was suspended in November 2017 following allegations of sexual assault against Ed Westwick. Filming recommenced in November 2018, after Westwick was stated to be legally innocent by the Los Angeles District Court.

Cast and characters
 Ed Westwick as Vincent Swan, the head salesman at Cachet Windows 
 James Buckley as Brian Fitzpatrick, a junior salesman 
 Joe Thomas as Martin Lavender, a junior salesman 
 Nigel Lindsay as Tony Walsh, the owner of Cachet Windows 
 Linzey Cocker as Sam Swan, Vincent's wife 
 Lauren O'Rourke as Carol, the secretary at Cachet Windows 
 Lee Ross as Ronnie Farrell, a gangster who pretends to be an antiquities dealer 
 Rachel Shenton as Joanne "Jo" Scott, a motivational spokeswoman turned head saleswoman for W-Windows (series 2)
Theo Barklem-Biggs as Ronnie "RJ" Farrell Jr., the son of Ronnie Farrell (series 2)

Episodes

Series 1 (2017)

Series 2 (2019)

References

External links
 
 

2017 British television series debuts
2019 British television series endings
2010s British sitcoms
2010s British workplace comedy television series
Adultery in television
BBC television sitcoms
English-language television shows
Narcissism in television
Television series set in 1983
Television shows set in Essex
Thurrock